R. Gundu Rao (27 September  1937 – 22 August 1993) was the Chief Minister of Karnataka state from 1980 to 1983.

Early life
Rao was born in a Kannada Brahmin family in Kushalanagara in the erstwhile Coorg Province (now in Kodagu district of Karnataka) of British India on 8 April 1937. His parents were K. Rama Rao and Chinnamma. His father was a Headmaster in a local school. He studied in Ammathi High school. He was a well-known Ball Badminton Player in Kodagu and had won numerous trophies.

Political career
Rao began his political career as Town Municipality President of Kushalanagar, a position in which he served for ten years. Later, he was elected as MLA from Somwarpet in 1972 and 1978. He served as minister in the government of D. Devaraj Urs and also as a Leader of Opposition for a brief period.

He became Chief minister of Karnataka after the collapse of the Urs government. As Chief Minister, Gundu Rao was responsible for the construction of the Majestic bus station in Bangalore, which is today known as Kempegowda Bus Station. He also sanctioned numerous Medical and Engineering Colleges in Karnataka. The Cauvery IInd Stage was completed within a year and half during his tenure. He was also responsible for the construction of the "Kala Mandira" in Mysore.

The Gokak agitation seeking supremacy for Kannada in the administration and education of Karnataka as well as the police firing on farmers at Nargund and Navalgund were the low points during his tenure as Chief minister. While he was acknowledged as an efficient administrator, he was more well known for his flamboyance, boldness and outspokenness.

Gundu Rao was also elected as a Member of Parliament from Bangalore South Constituency from 1989 to 1991.

Death
He died of Cancer in London on 22 August 1993, aged 56.

Personal life
His son Dinesh Gundu Rao is currently serving as a legislator from Gandhinagar constituency in Bangalore and a former minister for food and civil supplies.

References

External links 
:kn:ಆರ್. ಗುಂಡೂ ರಾವ್ Kannada biography of R.Gundu rao
Gundu Rao's biography release

1937 births
1993 deaths
People from Kodagu district
India MPs 1989–1991
Lok Sabha members from Karnataka
Leaders of the Opposition in the Karnataka Legislative Assembly
Chief ministers from Indian National Congress
Indian National Congress politicians from Karnataka
Chief Ministers of Karnataka
Chief ministers of Indian states
Mysore politicians
Mysore MLAs 1972–1977